Fahan is a district of Inishowen in the north of County Donegal, Ireland, located 5 km (3 miles) south of Buncrana. In Irish, Fahan is named after its patron saint, Saint Mura, first abbot of Fahan, an early Christian monastery.

History
The walled graveyard, located west of the rectory, contains the grave of pioneering nurse Agnes Jones, the ruins of a 6th-century monastery featuring a 7th-century cross-slab of St. Mura, and the ruins of a 16th-century monastery and 17th-century church together with a number of grave slabs bearing coats of arms. The monastery and village were sacked by Vikings in the 10th and 13th centuries. Medieval mill wheels are built into both the graveyard wall and the wall on the opposite side of the road.

Cecil Frances Alexander lived in the old rectory in the late 19th century. Her contemporary, Agnes Jones, trained with Florence Nightingale and served as a nurse in the Crimean War. Agnes Jones was born in Cambridge, England. Edward Maginn, a 19th-century bishop, served as a parish priest in Fahan. The church to the north of the rectory contains an early 20th-century stained-glass window by Evie Hone which depicts St. Elizabeth of Hungary.

Transport
Fahan railway station, which opened on 9 September 1864, closed for passenger traffic on 6 September 1948. It finally ceased operation on 10 August 1953.

Fahan is served by the McGonagle Bus Company, with a stop on the route between Buncrana and Derry.

Notable people
 W. G. S. Adams, political scientist and public servant
 William Alexander, Primate of All Ireland
 Andrew Barnard, British army general
 Paul Colton, Church of Ireland's Bishop of Cork
 George Downame, Bishop of Derry and writer on philosophical and religious subjects
 George Finlay, priest who served as Archdeacon of Clogher 
 Niall Frossach, King of Ailech
 Agnes Jones, nurse
 Johnny McCauley, singer-songwriter
 Saint Mura
 Máel Muire Othain, poet
 Andrew Simpson, actor
 St Clair Thomson, surgeon

Gallery

References

See also
 List of populated places in Ireland
 List of abbeys and priories in Ireland (County Donegal)

Towns and villages in County Donegal